Harmogenanina is a genus of air-breathing land snails or semislugs, terrestrial pulmonate gastropod mollusks in the family Helicarionidae.

Species
Species within the genus Harmogenanina include:
 Harmogenanina argentea
 Harmogenanina detecta
 Harmogenanina implicata
 Harmogenanina linophora
 Harmogenanina subdetecta

References

 Nomenclator Zoologicus info

 
Helicarionidae
Taxonomy articles created by Polbot